Ryan Finley (born March 27, 1991) is an American former professional soccer player.

Career

Youth and college
Born in Lumberton Township, New Jersey, Finley spent most of his high-school career at the Players Development Academy and the IMG Soccer Academy. In 2009, while a senior at Rancocas Valley Regional High School, Finley led his soccer team to the New Jersey state title in which he scored 20 goals throughout the season and was selected for the ESPN RISE Fall Boys' Soccer All-America team.

In 2009, Finley attended Duke University, where he played for the Duke Blue Devils for two seasons before spending his final two years playing for the Notre Dame Fighting Irish at the University of Notre Dame. In his freshman year at Duke Finley scored a team-leading 11 goals while also being named to the NSCAA All-South Region second team and ACC All-Freshman teams. In his sophomore year Finley led the Atlantic Coast Conference with 17 goals while also leading the NCAA in goals per game with 0.94 per game. That year Finley earned All-ACC first team honors and was voted the ACC Offensive Player of the Year.

In 2011, after transferring to Notre Dame, Finley led the soccer team with 7 goals that season and was named to the All-BIG EAST Second Team and All-Great Lakes Region Third Team. In his senior year Finley finished second in the country in goals scored with 21 while being named to the NSCAA All-America First Team, All-Great Lakes Region First Team, and the Big East Offensive Player of the Year.

Finley finished second in the Herman Trophy voting in 2012.

Columbus Crew
On January 17, 2013, Finley was selected 9th overall in the 2013 MLS SuperDraft by Columbus Crew. He made his professional debut for the Crew on March 9, 2013, against Vancouver Whitecaps FC at BC Place in which he came on in the 90th minute for Gláuber as the Crew lost the game 2–1. He then scored the first goal of his professional career on September 4, 2013, against Houston Dynamo at Columbus Crew Stadium in which he found the net in the 47th minute as the Crew won the game 2–0.

Chivas USA
On May 8, 2014, Finley was traded by Columbus to Chivas USA in exchange for a second-round pick in the 2016 MLS SuperDraft.

Charlotte Independence
Finley signed with USL club Charlotte Independence on March 25, 2015.

Ängelholms FF
Finley signed with Swedish side Ängelholms FF on March 17, 2016.

Career statistics
Sources:

References

External links

1991 births
American soccer players
Association football forwards
Central Jersey Spartans players
Charlotte Independence players
Chivas USA players
Columbus Crew draft picks
Columbus Crew players
Dayton Dutch Lions players
Duke Blue Devils men's soccer players
Indiana Invaders players
Living people
Major League Soccer players
Notre Dame Fighting Irish men's soccer players
Ocean City Nor'easters players
People from Lumberton Township, New Jersey
Rancocas Valley Regional High School alumni
Reading United A.C. players
Soccer players from New Jersey
Sportspeople from Burlington County, New Jersey
United States men's youth international soccer players
United States men's under-20 international soccer players
USL League Two players
USL Championship players
Superettan players
Danish 1st Division players
All-American men's college soccer players